HMAS Ibis (M 1183) was a  built by the Montrose Shipyard, launched on 18 November 1955, and commissioned into the Royal Navy as 'HMS Singleton.

The ship was purchased by Australia in 1961, and commissioned into the Royal Australian Navy as HMAS Ibis on 7 September 1962.

During the mid-1960s, Ibis was one of several ships operating in support of the Malaysian government during the Indonesia-Malaysia Confrontation. This service was later recognised with the battle honour "Malaysia 1964–66".Ibis'' was decommissioned on 4 May 1984.

References

Ton-class minesweepers of the Royal Navy
Ships built in Scotland
1955 ships
Cold War minesweepers of the United Kingdom
Ton-class minesweepers of the Royal Australian Navy
Cold War minesweepers of Australia